Atlante or  Atlantes may refer to:
 Atlas (architecture), a column in the shape of a man
 Atlante San Alejo, a Salvadoran football club
 Atlante F.C., a Mexican football club
 Atlante (private equity fund)
 Atlante-class tugboat
 Atlante (keelboat), a French sailboat design
Atlantes (sorcerer), a fictional character in various chansons de geste and in the poem Orlando Furioso

See also
 Atalante (disambiguation)
 Atlant (disambiguation)
 Atlanta (disambiguation)
 Atlantean (disambiguation)